Pedro Ramos Guerra (born April 28, 1935), is a Cuban former professional baseball pitcher, who played in Major League Baseball (MLB) for the Washington Senators / Minnesota Twins, Cleveland Indians, New York Yankees, and the expansion Washington Senators, all of the American League (AL), and the Philadelphia Phillies, Pittsburgh Pirates, and Cincinnati Reds, all of the National League (NL), over the course of a 15-year career (–; –). On April 11, 1961, in the Twins’ first game ever, Ramos was the winning pitcher, when the team defeated the Yankees, 6-0, at Yankee Stadium.

A starter most of his career, "Pete" Ramos became an unexpected sensation in September 1964 after being traded from the Indians to the Yankees for $75,000 and two players to be named later (after the season, the Indians received Ralph Terry and Bud Daley). In 13 appearances for the Yankees, all in relief, Ramos saved eight games and posted a 1.25 earned-run average as the Yankees barely held off the Chicago White Sox and Baltimore Orioles down the pennant stretch. In 21 innings, Ramos struck out 21 batters and walked none. Because the trade came after August 31, Ramos was not eligible to pitch in the World Series, which New York lost in seven games to the Bob Gibson-led St. Louis Cardinals.

As a Senator, in his second big-league season, Ramos surrendered one of the more memorable home runs in the career of Yankees slugger Mickey Mantle. On May 30, 1956, Mantle tore into a Ramos pitch and nearly drove it out of Yankee Stadium, hitting the facade of the top deck in right field. In their heyday, Ramos and Mantle were considered among the fastest runners in the major leagues. Mantle and Ramos raced with Ramos stumbling at the start, Mantle winning.

As a hitter, Ramos was an occasional home run threat. He posted a .155 batting average (109-for-703) with 76 runs, hitting 15 home runs with 56 RBI. Defensively, he recorded a .977 fielding percentage.

See also
 List of Major League Baseball all-time leaders in home runs by pitchers

References

External links

Pedro Ramos at SABR (Baseball BioProject)
Pedro Ramos at Baseball Gauge

1935 births
Living people
American League All-Stars
California Angels scouts
Cardenales de Lara players
Cuban expatriate baseball players in Venezuela
Cardenales de Villahermosa players
Charros de Jalisco players
Cienfuegos players
Cincinnati Reds players
Cleveland Indians players
Columbus Jets players
Diablos Rojos del México players
Hagerstown Packets players
Indianapolis Indians players
Kingsport Cherokees players
Major League Baseball pitchers
Major League Baseball players from Cuba
Cuban expatriate baseball players in the United States
Minor league baseball coaches
Minor league baseball managers
Minnesota Twins players
Morristown Red Sox players
New York Yankees players
People from Pinar del Río
Pericos de Puebla players
Philadelphia Phillies players
Pittsburgh Pirates players
Richmond Braves players
Savannah Indians players
Tidewater Tides players
Tigres de Aragua players
Vancouver Mounties players
Washington Senators (1901–1960) players
Washington Senators (1961–1971) players
21st-century African-American people